Bath is a city in Sagadahoc County, Maine, in the United States. The population was 8,766 at the 2020 census. It is the county seat of Sagadahoc County, which includes one city and 10 towns. The city is popular with tourists, many drawn by its 19th-century architecture. It is home to the Bath Iron Works and Heritage Days Festival, held annually on the Fourth of July weekend. It is commonly known as "The City of Ships" because of all the sailing ships that were built in the Bath shipyards. Bath is part of the metropolitan statistical area of Greater Portland.

History

Abenaki Indians called the area Sagadahoc, meaning "mouth of big river". It was a reference to the Kennebec River, which Samuel de Champlain explored in 1605. Popham Colony was established in 1607 downstream, together with Fort St George. The settlement failed due to harsh weather and lack of leadership, but the colonists built the New World's first oceangoing vessel constructed by English shipwrights, the Virginia of Sagadahoc. It provided passage back to England. Most of Bath, Maine, was settled by travelers from Bath, England.

The next settlement at Sagadahoc was about 1660, when the land was taken from an Indian sagamore known as Robinhood. Incorporated as part of Georgetown in 1753, Bath was set off and incorporated as a town on February 17, 1781. It was named by the postmaster, Dummer Sewall, after Bath in Somerset, England. In 1844, a portion of the town was set off to create West Bath. On June 14, 1847, Bath was incorporated as a city, and in 1854 designated county seat. Land was annexed from West Bath in 1855.

Several industries developed in Bath, including lumber, iron, and brass, with trade in ice and coal. The city and surrounding area is renowned for its shipbuilding and, at one point, was home to more than 200 shipbuilding firms.  The industry began in 1743, when Jonathan Philbrook and his sons built two vessels. Since that time, roughly 5,000 vessels have been launched from Bath, which became the nation's fifth largest seaport by the mid-19th century.  The clipper ships built in Bath sailed to ports around the world. The last commercial enterprise to build wooden ships in the city was the Percy & Small Shipyard, which was acquired for preservation in 1971 by the Maine Maritime Museum. The most well-known shipyard is the Bath Iron Works, which was founded in 1884 by Thomas W. Hyde.  Hyde became the firm's general manager in 1888. It has built hundreds of wooden and steel vessels, mostly warships for the U.S. Navy. During World War II, Bath Iron Works launched one new ship approximately every 17 days. The shipyard today is a major regional employer, and currently operates as a division of the General Dynamics Corporation.

In the Bath, Maine, anti-Catholic riot of 1854, an Irish Catholic church was burned.

The city is noted for its Federal, Greek Revival, and Italianate architecture, including the 1858 Custom House and Post Office designed by Ammi B. Young. Bath is a sister city to Shariki (now Tsugaru) in Japan, where the locally built full-rigged ship Cheseborough was wrecked in 1889. Scenes from the movies Message in a Bottle (1999) and The Man Without a Face (1993) were filmed in Bath.

In 1915, Fred Cox, owner of Hallet's Drug Store on Front Street, purchased the street clock standing at the corner of Front and Centre Streets from Boston, where it was built by Seth Thomas Clock Company four years earlier. It was moved from 70 Front Street to its current location in 1966, having been purchased by Harry Crooker. His family later donated it to the city, with the proviso that it be maintained and kept in a continuously operating condition, else it be returned to the family. The clock was restored in 2000. Crooker established local construction company in 1935. It was sold in 2014, after 79 years of family ownership.

Geography

Bath is located at  (43.916293, −69.822565).

Greenspace
The city of Bath includes several nature preserves that are protected by the Kennebec Estuary Land Trust. These areas include, Thorne Head Preserve (located 2.1 miles north of Bath,) Butler Head Preserve (location 5.2 miles north of Bath,) there are also numerous multiple parks, and walking trails located throughout the town such as the Whiskeag Trail.

Demographics

2010 census
As of the census of 2010, there were 8,514 people, 3,932 households, and 2,172 families living in the city. The racial makeup of the city was 95.1% White, 1.2% African American, 0.3% Native American, 0.6% Asian, 0.4% from other races, and 2.3% from two or more races. Hispanic or Latino of any race were 1.8% of the population.

There were 3,932 households, of which 27.5% had children under the age of 18 living with them, 37.5% were married couples living together, 13.6% had a female householder with no husband present, 4.2% had a male householder with no wife present, and 44.8% were non-families. 36.1% of all households were made up of individuals, and 13.9% had someone living alone who was 65 years of age or older. The average household size was 2.14 and the average family size was 2.79.

The median age in the city was 41 years. 22.2% of residents were under the age of 18; 8.1% were between the ages of 18 and 24; 24.7% were from 25 to 44; 28.5% were from 45 to 64; and 16.5% were 65 years of age or older. The gender makeup of the city was 46.7% male and 53.3% female.

2000 census
As of the census of 2000, there were 9,266 people, 4,042 households, and 2,344 families living in the city. The racial makeup of the city was 94.92% White, 1.60% Black or African American, 0.58% Native American, 0.47% Asian, 0.13% Pacific Islander, 0.68% from other races, and 1.62% from two or more races. Hispanic or Latino of any race were 1.76% of the population.

There were 4,042 households, out of which 29.7% had children under the age of 18 living with them, 40.8% were married couples living together, 13.1% had a female householder with no husband present, and 42.0% were non-families. 34.1% of all households were made up of individuals, and 13.0% had someone living alone who was 65 years of age or older. The average household size was 2.26 and the average family size was 2.91.

In the city, the population was spread out, with 25.0% under the age of 18, 8.4% from 18 to 24, 29.5% from 25 to 44, 23.0% from 45 to 64, and 14.1% who were 65 years of age or older. The median age was 37 years. For every 100 females, there were 91.4 males. For every 100 females age 18 and over, there were 86.9 males.

The median household income in the city was $36,372, and the median family income was $45,830. Males had a median income of $35,064 versus $22,439 for females. The per capita income for the city was $19,112. About 9.3% of families and 11.8% of the population were below the poverty line, including 17.5% of those under age 18 and 9.6% of those age 65 or over.

2013 Voter registration

Maine requires voters to register with a party to vote in primaries, also called a closed primary. However, voters are not required to register with a party to vote for their primary winners in the general election.

Education

 RSU 1
 Dike-Newell Elementary, grades K–2
 Fisher-Mitchell Elementary, grades 3–5
 Bath Middle School – serves 430 students in grades 6–8 as of 2006. The school's mascot is the Destroyers, a type of ship built by the Bath Iron Works. The school colors are blue and white.
 Morse High School – The Morse High Shipbuilders (team). Sports include Cross Country, Football, Soccer, Cheerleading, Swimming, Basketball, Wrestling, Tennis, Indoor/Outdoor Track & Field, Lacrosse, Softball, and Baseball. Clubs include the International Club, Ambassadors Club, Debate Team, Math Team, and more. The school colors are blue and white. A new school building was completed in 2020, with students moving in during February 2021. Morse High School (previously Bath High School), which was founded in 1891, is believed to have the oldest active High School Alumni Association in the United States.
 Hyde School, a college preparatory school – serves 149 students in grades 9–12 as of 2012. The school's mascot is the wolfpack. The school colors are navy blue and gold.

Library

Patten Free Library

Notable people

Sister city relations
 – Tsugaru, Aomori, Japan – Friendship City from 2006

Climate
Bath has a humid continental climate (Köppen Dfb) with cold and snowy winters and mild summers. Precipitation is high the whole year, with a sizeable snow pack usually forming during winter months. Compared to inland areas, winters are not severe, although colder than areas right on the ocean. Diurnal temperature variation is strong throughout the year. In winter this means that highs around freezing with lows in the single-digit Fahrenheit range are common.

Sites of interest
 Maine Maritime Museum
 Maine Eastern Railroad
 Chocolate Church Arts Center
 Studio Theatre of Bath
 Bath Skate Park
 Bath Municipal Band

Cemeteries

Bath has twenty known cemeteries. This is a relatively small number compared to neighboring communities (Phippsburg, for example, has over one hundred), because, from the early 1900s, Bath was densely populated, which left less room for family cemeteries.

The city maintains its "big three" cemeteries: Oak Grove, Maple Grove and Calvary. It also manages four smaller burials grounds: Dummer Sewall (Dummer and Beacon streets), David Trufant (claimed by author Parker McCobb Reed in 1894 to be the oldest burying ground in Bath; Spring and Middle streets), Pettingill (Riverview Road) and Fairview (on Fairview Lane). Only Pettengill has pieces of stones remaining, including that of a Revolutionary War veteran.

Graveyards not managed by the city, which tend to be old family plots, include Harrison (Stoney Island Road), Crawford (North Bath Road), Roberts-Edgecomb (North Bath Road), Edgecomb (North Bath Road), Purington (North Bath and Whiskeag roads), Ham (Ridge and Whiskeag roads), Ward (Bayshore Road) and the "Irish" ground (Varney Mill Road).

The Whittam (or Witham) graveyard (Bayshore Road) and Wise-Welch (North Bath Road), which includes Bath's oldest documented burial in 1749, were identified in the 1970s, but are not found today.

Those found in sources, yet have no burials or exact locations identified, are South Street (possibly South and Washington streets), Marshall (Washington and Marshall streets), the "Turnpike" ground (likely in West Bath), and Marr's Hill (in the area of Corliss and Washington streets).

There is also a Ward Cemetery.

References

Further reading

  History of Bath and Environs, Sagadahoc County, Maine, 1607–1894. By Parker McCobb Reed. Published 1894.  Full image at books.google.
 History of Destroyers at Bath Iron Works

External links

 City of Bath, Maine
 Patten Free Library
 Bath Historical Society
 Sagadahoc Preservation, Inc.
 Main Street Bath
 Things to Do Bath Maine
 Maine's First Ship – Reconstructing the Virginia

 
County seats in Maine
Populated places established in 1753
Portland metropolitan area, Maine
Cities in Sagadahoc County, Maine
Port cities and towns in Maine
1753 establishments in the Thirteen Colonies
Cities in Maine
Populated coastal places in Maine